Vladimír Vaina (2 November 1909–8 February 1996) was a Czech rower. He competed in the men's double sculls event at the 1936 Summer Olympics.

References

External links

1909 births
1996 deaths
Czech male rowers
Olympic rowers of Czechoslovakia
Rowers at the 1936 Summer Olympics
Place of birth missing